Goce Toleski (born 5 May 1977 in Skopje) is a retired football player from the Republic of Macedonia who finished his career at Ohrid 2004.

Club career

Macedonia
Toleski signed for FK Rabotnicki in January 2004.

In summer 2006, Toleski left for FK Renova.

Germany
Toleski moved to SV Wacker Burghausen of 2. Fußball-Bundesliga. But the club relegated after a poor second half season.

Czech Republic
He was signed by SK Slavia Praha on a two-year contract in December 2007. He won the 2007-2008 Best foreigner player in the league.

International career
He made his senior debut for Macedonia in an April 2002 friendly match against Finland and has earned a total of 18 caps, scoring 1 goal. After a three-year hiatus, he was recalled to the squad in September 2007, played both European Championship qualification matches against Russia and Estonia. The latter was his final international.

References

External links
Profile at MacedonianFootball.com 

Gambrinus Liga statistics 

1977 births
Living people
Sportspeople from Ohrid
Association football forwards
Macedonian footballers
North Macedonia international footballers
FK Tikvesh players
FK Napredok players
FK Rabotnički players
FK Renova players
SV Wacker Burghausen players
FK Baník Most players
SK Slavia Prague players
SK Sigma Olomouc players
FK Mladá Boleslav players
FK Ohrid players
Macedonian First Football League players
Macedonian Second Football League players
2. Bundesliga players
Czech First League players
Macedonian expatriate footballers
Expatriate footballers in Germany
Macedonian expatriate sportspeople in Germany
Expatriate footballers in the Czech Republic
Macedonian expatriate sportspeople in the Czech Republic